Horst Wängler is an East German retired slalom canoeist who competed in the 1960s. He won four medals at the ICF Canoe Slalom World Championships with two golds (Folding K-1 team: 1961, Mixed C-2 team: 1965), a silver (Mixed C-2: 1967) and a bronze (Mixed C-2: 1965).

References
ICF medalists for Olympic and World Championships - Part 2: rest of flatwater (now sprint) and remaining canoeing disciplines: 1936-2007.

German male canoeists
Possibly living people
Year of birth missing (living people)
Medalists at the ICF Canoe Slalom World Championships